There are varying interpretations of Max Weber's liberalism due to his well-known sociological achievements. Max Weber is considered an eminent founder of modern social sciences, rivaled by the figures of Émile Durkheim and Karl Marx. Some students of Weberian thought have paid less attention to Weber's extensive and often passionate engagement with the politics of his day, particularly in the United States. However, European intellectuals have given more attention to his political thought. Most of Weber's political writings have not been published in translation, or have been translated only recently in a piecemeal form.

Overview
Weber's political ideas have inspired disagreement in Germany for decades.  His conception of democracy has been the subject of particularly heated debate.  Weber rejected the Wilhelmine regime's authoritarian political structure.  He advocated parliamentary and democratic reform.  Weber championed the freedoms of what he called the "age of the Rights of Man". Some find the liberalism of Weber as problematic.

Raymond Aron has noted that Weber was not a "liberal in the American sense," and not, "strictly speaking, a democrat in the sense that the French, the English, or the Americans gave the term." Aron saw Weber to have looked to place the "glory of the nation and the power of the state" above all other things.

Stephen P. Turner and Regis A. Factor have concluded that Weber rejected the philosophical basis for most Western formulations of Enlightenment liberalism. Weber conceived "parliamentarization" primarily for selecting leaders. Weber was strongly technocratic.

Interpretations

Political views
JP Mayer wrote a 1944 critique of Max Weber,Max Weber and German Politics: a study in political sociology. Published in England during the war, the work never appeared in German translation. Mayer had been an archivist for the Social Democratic Party (SPD) and the primary book reviewer for the Vorwärts, the SPD party paper. He was a target of Nazi persecution from which he escaped to England, where he became involved with the Labour Party and was a member of the faculty at the London School of Economics during the end of the Second World War. Mayer labelled Weber's philosophy as the "new Machiavellianism of the steel age." The conception of the state that Weber supported was viewed as a middle phase in a destructive tradition of German realpolitik, a tradition that Mayer saw to extend from Bismarck to Hitler. Mayer interpreted a "tragic" satisfaction with which Weber was seen to embrace "the empty character" of Heinrich Rickert's neo-Kantian philosophy of value. Mayer viewed Weber's value theory as a nihilistic contribution to the rise of National Socialism.

Wolfgang J. Mommsen initiated debate by arguing that in the 1959 German publication of Max Weber and German Politics 1890–1920. Mommsen questioned the sociologist's liberal reputation. According to Mommsen, Weber's sociological idea of charismatic authority was evident in his political views and was "close to fascist notions of plebiscitary leadership." Mommsen wrote that Weber's theory of democracy "lent itself all too readily to an authoritarian reinterpretation" Mommsen also associated Weber with the rise of Hitler: "Weber's teachings concerning charismatic leadership coupled with the radical formulation of the meaning of democratic institutions, contributed to making the German people inwardly ready to acclaim the leadership position of Adolf Hitler."

Weber's call for the democratic reform of the Wilhelmine state and his involvement in the drafting of the Weimar Constitution, had led German intellectuals in the 1950s to consider him as an authority who could justify the democratic character of the new Federal Republic of Germany. Mommsen's thesis, that Max Weber supported parliamentary democracy as a means to serve the power interests of the German nation-state, met a sharp response because, in Raymond Aron's words, that removed "the new German democracy of a 'founding father,' a glorious ancestor, and a spokesman of genius."

Politics and sociology
Weber's political views have been considered to threaten the reputation of his sociology. Günther Roth, Reinhard Bendix and Karl Loewenstein have defended Weberian sociology by arguing that it stands separate from his political convictions. They consider Weber's distinction between scientific value neutrality and evaluative politics to support this claim. In their view, Weber's politics should be interpreted as separate from the interpretation of his sociology. This idea was rejected by Mommsen.

Mommsen wrote of continuities between Weber's "value-neutral" sociology and his "evaluative" politics. The second edition of Max Weber and German Politics 1890-1920 argued that "values and science, in Weber's thought, were interdependent." Critics were dismissed as attempting "to shield Max Weber's sociological works against any possible criticism based on political aspects." Roth responded in a 1965 American sociological journal, stating that Weber was a major target for a series of critiques aimed at political sociology in general, if not at most of social science. Roth also stated that Mommsen was removed from the interest of American sociologists in Weber and that Mommsen's treatment becomes questionable when he interprets Weber's sociological analysis as political ideology. Roth stated that his "major intent" was "not to provide an historical defense of Weber but a review of critiques as they seem to bear on the raison d'etre of political sociology." Roth further stated that Weber "must appear relativist and Machiavellian to all those who, for ideological reasons, cannot recognize any dividing line between political sociology and political ideology. Weber emphatically insisted on such a distinction, while his critics refuse to distinguish between his scholarship and his politics".

Raymond Aron did not consider Weber's sociology to stand above politics. He viewed Weber, in both politics and sociology, to be a typical "power-politician". Aron wrote in 1971 that Weber "belongs to the posterity of Machiavelli as much as to the contemporaries of Nietzsche" and that "the struggle for power between classes and individuals" seemed to Weber as the "essence" of politics.

See also

Classical liberalism
Max Weber bibliography
Social liberalism

References

Liberalism
Max Weber